Noah Litchfield Chesmain (born 16 December 1997) is an English professional footballer who plays as a defender, for Maidstone United.

He came through the youth system at Millwall, beginning his scholarship in 2014, before making his professional debut in November 2015. He then had a loan spell at National League sides Welling United in 2016, and then Boreham Wood in late 2017. He was released by Millwall at the end of his contract in 2018 before signing for Colchester United. He joined Hitchin Town on loan in August 2018, and then Hungerford Town on loan in March 2019. He was released by Colchester in summer 2019.

Career

Millwall
Born in Waltham Forest, London, Chesmain signed as a scholar with Millwall in June 2014. He made his debut for the club on 28 November 2015 when he came on for Shane Ferguson 83-minutes into a 1–0 win over Bury at The Den.

After becoming a regular in Millwall's under-23 squad, Chesmain experienced competitive football on loan with Welling United in January through March 2016, where he made 12 appearances in the National League. He also had a loan spell with Boreham Wood in late 2017.

He was released by Millwall at the end of the 2017–18 season.

Colchester United
Following a successful trial in the latter stages of the 2017–18 season, on 25 May 2018, Chesmain signed a pre-contract agreement with League Two club Colchester United on a one-year deal.

Chesmain signed for Southern League Premier Division Central side Hitchin Town in an initial month-long loan deal on 21 August 2018. He made his debut on 25 August in Hitchin's 1–0 win over Redditch United, providing the assist for the goal. He scored his first goal in senior football on 16 February 2019 with the only goal in Hitchin's 1–0 win at Barwell.

Chesmain joined National League South side Hungerford Town on loan in March 2019.

On 14 May 2019, it was announced Chesmain was to leave Colchester United at the end of his contract having failed to make a first-team appearance for the club.

Career statistics

References

External links

1997 births
Living people
People from the London Borough of Waltham Forest
English footballers
Association football defenders
English Football League players
National League (English football) players
Southern Football League players
Millwall F.C. players
Welling United F.C. players
Boreham Wood F.C. players
Colchester United F.C. players
Hitchin Town F.C. players
Hungerford Town F.C. players